

Events
Guillem Augier Novella penned A People Grieving for the Death of their Lord, a planh on the death of Raymond Roger Trencavel.
Gui d'Ussel, in obedience to a papal injunction from Pierre de Castelnau, ceased composing and writing.

Births
 Shang Ting (died 1288), writer of Chinese Sanqu poetry

Deaths
 Nizami Ganjavi (born 1141), Persian romantic epic poet
 Ruzbihan Baqli (born 1128), Persian poet, mystic, and Sufi

13th-century poetry
Poetry

References